Xalqobod or Khalkabad may refer to:
Places (Towns in Uzbekistan)

 Xalqobod, Surxondaryo Region
 Xalqobod, Namangan Region
 Xalqobod, Karakalpakstan